The Retro Engine is a multiplatform game engine developed by Australian programmer Christian Whitehead, best known for its use in Sega's Sonic the Hedgehog series.

Overview
Unlike most modern game engines, the Retro Engine is primarily tailored for creating two-dimensional games like those released for 32-bit or below-era consoles, such as the Sega Saturn, Sega Genesis or the Super Nintendo Entertainment System. For this reason, the engine focuses more on raster graphics and palette manipulation, although it does feature support for widescreen graphics and online functionality.

History
Australian programmer Christian Whitehead created the Retro Engine for use with a 2007 fangame entitled Retro Sonic, which is based upon the original Sonic games released for the Sega Genesis. The game became notable after its release for its accuracy to the games, despite not being a ROM hack or modification to an existing Sonic game. Retro Sonic later merged with two other Sonic fangames, Sonic XG and Sonic Nexus, to form Retro Sonic Nexus.

In 2009, Sega asked fans for ideas on a game to port to iOS. As a response, Whitehead produced a proof-of-concept video showing Sega's 1993 Sega CD game Sonic CD running on an iPhone. Sega later officially released the port in 2011 for various platforms, such as the Xbox 360, PlayStation 3, Windows, iOS and Android. Whitehead, along with fellow Sonic scene member Simon "Stealth" Thomley, were later commissioned to create remakes of Sonic the Hedgehog and Sonic the Hedgehog 2 using the engine, released for mobile platforms in 2013. 

In 2014, to celebrate the twentieth anniversary of the release of Sonic 3 & Knuckles, Whitehead and Thomley produced a proof-of-concept showing the game using the engine on an iPhone. Despite fan support, Sega did not approve of the project. Thomley speculated that this was due to legal problems regarding the music. In 2015, Whitehead, Thomley's studio Headcannon, and PagodaWest Games collaborated on an original Sonic game using the Retro Engine titled Sonic Mania, which released August 2017, with DLC titled Sonic Mania Plus being released in July 2018.

In 2019, Whitehead, in collaboration with other members behind Sonic Mania, founded a new video game studio named Evening Star. In reference to the studio name, the Retro Engine initially had been renamed the Star Engine. In October 2021, Evening Star announced development was underway for a game using the Star Engine. In conjunction with this, it was announced that the Star Engine had been turned into a separate engine with a focus on 3D rendering, with the Retro Engine remaining as their 2D game engine. In January 2021, an open-source decompilation of the Retro Engine versions of Sonic CD, Sonic the Hedgehog, and Sonic the Hedgehog 2 were released, allowing the latter two games to be run natively on PC platforms.

The Retro Engine was also used for the compilation Sonic Origins in 2022, which includes remakes of Sonic the Hedgehog, Sonic the Hedgehog 2, Sonic CD, and Sonic 3 & Knuckles.

Games

Reception
Reviewers praised the Retro Engine for its performance, which has been called superior to simply emulating the original games. TouchArcade has referred to the remasters of Sonic the Hedgehog and Sonic the Hedgehog 2 as "spectacular".

Whitehead has named games such as Ristar, Knuckles' Chaotix, and Dynamite Headdy, as well as non-Sega games like the Castlevania series, as others that would be possible to port to the engine.

References

External links
 

2008 software
Proprietary software
Video game engines